Arvo Lamberg (born 3 July 1943) is a Finnish former footballer. He played in five matches for the Finland national football team from 1965 to 1969.

In Mestaruussarja, he played 213 games and scored 80 goals. He played 157 games and scored 48 goals for Kokkolan Palloveikot, and played 56 games and scored 32 goals for Gamlakarleby Bollklubb. He also scored 21 goals in Suomensarja for GBK.

In addition to football, Lamberg was also an ice hockey player, playing 11 games in SM-sarja for Kokkolan Hermes.

Honours

As a player 
Kokkolan Palloveikot
 Mestaruussarja: 1969

References

1943 births
Living people
Finnish footballers
Finland international footballers
Place of birth missing (living people)
Association football forwards